Sanjay Gandhi Institute of Trauma and Orthopaedics (SGITO) is a government run autonomous Super Speciality Hospital and Research Institute in trauma and orthopaedics. The institute is a regional trauma and orthopedic care center in karnataka. It is run by Government of Karnataka it is located in Bangalore, India.

History
The hospital started in 1984 and now it is regional trauma and orthopedic care center in Karnataka state India. In 2004 the institute started Nursing College.
It started a sports injury centre in 2015, the second government hospital in the country to have one after Safdarjung Hospital in Delhi.

References

Hospitals in Bangalore
Hospitals established in 1984
1984 establishments in Karnataka